Adam Mark Shimmons (born 16 October 1972) is an English cricketer. Shimmons is a left-handed batsman who bowls right-arm fast-medium. He was born in Hillingdon, Middlesex and educated at Idsall Grammar School in Shifnal, Shropshire.

Shimmons made his debut for Shropshire in the 1996 Minor Counties Championship against Dorset. Shimmons has played Minor counties cricket for Shropshire from 1996 to present, which has included 46 Minor Counties Championship appearances and 30 MCCA Knockout Trophy appearances, while playing at club level for Shifnal and Oulton Park. He made his List A debut against Sussex in the 1997 NatWest Trophy. He made 10 further List A appearances, the last of which came against Warwickshire in the 2004 Cheltenham & Gloucester Trophy. In his 11 List A matches, he scored 67 runs at an average of 11.16, with a high score of 23. With the ball, he took 13 wickets at a bowling average of 29.84, with best figures of 3/30.

References

External links
Adam Shimmons at ESPNcricinfo
Adam Shimmons at CricketArchive

1972 births
Living people
People from Hillingdon
English cricketers
Shropshire cricketers